Jack Lawson Dunfee (26 October 1901 – 13 September 1975) was a British motor racing driver, theatrical impresario, and later farmer who was one of the "Bentley Boys" at Brooklands before the Second World War.

Motor racing
Dunfee was one of four sons of Colonel Vickers Dunfee, and the older brother of Clive Dunfee. In 1932 the Dunfee brothers raced the BRDC 500 Miles Race at Brooklands, in the "Old Number One" Speed Six Bentley, with a brand new 8-litre engine installed. After the first driving stint Jack Dunfee was in fourth place when he entered the pits. Clive took over, and shortly after, in passing Earl Howe's Bugatti, he went too high up the banking, putting the wheel of his car over the lip. The car cartwheeled over the top, hit a large tree and plunged down through the trees to the road below. Clive was thrown out and killed instantly.

Marriage
In 1939 Jack Dunfee married actress and dancer Sandra Storme, but the marriage ended in divorce.

In 1953 he married model Audrey White, but that marriage also ended in divorce.

References

External links
http://www.racingsportscars.com/driver/Jack-Dunfee-GB.html
http://bufvc.ac.uk/allbufvc/search.php?q=Jack+Dunfee

English racing drivers
Brooklands people
Bentley Boys
1901 births
1975 deaths
20th-century British farmers
European Championship drivers